Events from the year 1718 in Canada.

Incumbents
French Monarch: Louis XV
British and Irish Monarch: George I

Governors
Governor General of New France: Philippe de Rigaud Vaudreuil
Colonial Governor of Louisiana: Jean-Baptiste Le Moyne de Bienville
Governor of Nova Scotia: John Doucett
Governor of Placentia: Samuel Gledhill

Births
 September 8 - Joseph Coulon de Jumonville, military officer. (died 1754)
 September 17 - Joseph Fairbanks, merchant and political figure in Nova Scotia. (died 1796) born in Sherborn, Massachusetts

Full date unknown
 John Burbidge, soldier, land owner, judge and political figure in Nova Scotia. (died 1812) born in Cowes, England
 Robert Campbell, merchant and political figure in Nova Scotia. (died 1775)

Deaths
 August 4 - René Lepage de Sainte-Claire, landlord.

 
Canada
18
1710s in Canada